North Rock is an offshore rock near the boundary between the Gulf of Maine and the Bay of Fundy east of the North American continent. Its ownership is disputed between the Canadian province of New Brunswick and the U.S. state of Maine as part of the territorial and maritime boundary dispute surrounding Machias Seal Island nearby to the south. The disputed area is referred to colloquially as the "Grey Zone".

See also 
 List of areas disputed by the United States and Canada
 List of islands of Maine
 List of islands of New Brunswick

References 

Islands of Washington County, Maine
Coastal islands of New Brunswick
Canada–United States border disputes
Disputed islands
Landforms of Charlotte County, New Brunswick
Islands of Maine
Coastal islands of Maine